Wolfgang Mulack (born 4 January 1948) is a former professional German footballer.

Mulack made 22 appearances in the Bundesliga for Tennis Borussia Berlin during his playing career.

References

External links 
 

1948 births
Living people
German footballers
Association football defenders
Bundesliga players
Tennis Borussia Berlin players